Prince Joseph Wenzel (Wenceslas; Venceslao) Franz Anastasius of Liechtenstein (1767–1842) was a son of Prince Karl Borromäus of Liechtenstein and Maria Anna Antonia, Countess of Dietrichstein-Weichselstädt, Baroness of Hollenburg and Finkenstein.

While still a child he was destined for the Catholic priesthood and so in 1774 - at the age of nine - he was sent by his father to start his religious life at the Cathedral of Cologne.

In 1783–4 (aged sixteen) he was living in Rovereto in the Italian Alps under the tutelage of ‘abate’ Carlo Tacchi (1745-1813), as recorded in the memoir of the Italian musician Giacomo Gotifredo Ferrari (1763–1842). Ferrari stated:

In the years 1785–6 the Prince was in Rome studying theology and living in the monastery of St. Stefano del Cacco, where he was described in the records as Eccellentissimo Principe Don Giuseppe Venceslao di Liechtenstein da Vienna, Canonico della Metropoli di Colonia. In Rome, in November 1786 the now nineteen-year old Prince came to make the acquaintance of the poet Johann Wolfgang von Goethe (1749-1832), who met him there at the Academy of Arcadia, a fashionable meeting-place for elite men and well-known literary and artistic figures.

The Prince was ordained into the Catholic priesthood in 1788.

After the prince's time in Rome, and on the advice of Cardinal Garampi (1725–92) he continued his studies at a French seminary, eventually being made a Canon in Salzburg. After this, however, a military career attracted him more than a priestly career and in 1804 he received secularisation in Rome and then joined the Austrian army, which he left as Major General in 1814; he died in 1842.

References

Princes of Liechtenstein
1767 births
1842 deaths
Austrian generals
18th-century Austrian Roman Catholic priests